Wanshoulu station may refer to:

 Wanshou Lu station, in Beijing, China
 Wanshoulu station (Xi'an Metro), in Xi'an, Shaanxi Province, China
 Wanshoulu station (Chongqing Rail Transit), in Chongqing, China, on Line 10 (Chongqing Rail Transit)